Lecanopteris is a genus of ferns in the family Polypodiaceae, subfamily Microsoroideae, according to the Pteridophyte Phylogeny Group classification of 2016 (PPG I). They have swollen hollow rhizomes that provide homes for symbiotic ants. All are epiphytic plants that naturally occur from Southeast Asia to New Guinea. Several species are in commerce, being grown as houseplants and greenhouse curiosities.

Taxonomy

Phylogeny
The monophyletic genus Lecanopteris has been divided into two sub-genera, Lecanopteris and Myrmecopteris. All the species have rhizomes associated with ants. Subgenus Lecanopteris was monophyletic, and Myrmecopteris was paraphyletic. A 2019 molecular phylogenetic study suggested that the genus was related to three other clades, treated as genera, related as shown in the following cladogram.

, the Checklist of Ferns and Lycophytes of the World recognizes the segregate genera; other sources do not.

Species

, the Checklist of Ferns and Lycophytes of the World recognized the following species in Lecanopteris s.s.
Lecanopteris balgooyi Hennipman
Lecanopteris carnosa (Reinw.) Blume
Lecanopteris celebica Hennipman
Lecanopteris crustacea Copel.
Lecanopteris darnaedii Hennipman
Lecanopteris deparioides (Ces.) Baker
Lecanopteris holttumii Hennipman
Lecanopteris luzonensis Hennipman
Lecanopteris mirabilis Copel.
Lecanopteris pumila Blume
Lecanopteris sarcopus (Teijsm. & Binn.) Copel.
Lecanopteris sinuosa (Wall. ex Hook.) Copel.
Lecanopteris spinosa Jermy & T.Walker

References

Lecanopteris

 
Epiphytes
Symbiosis
Taxa named by Caspar Georg Carl Reinwardt
Fern genera
Myrmecophytes